Randolph is a city in Dakota County, Minnesota, United States. The population was 436 at the 2010 census.

History
A post office called Randolph has been in operation since 1886. The city took its name from Randolph Township.

Geography

The city of Randolph is entirely within Randolph Township geographically but is a separate entity.

Lake Byllesby and the Cannon River are both nearby.

Randolph is in the southern part of Dakota County. The boundary line between Dakota, Goodhue, and Rice counties is nearby.

Demographics

2010 census
As of the census of 2010, there were 436 people, 168 households, and 118 families living in the city. The racial makeup of the city was 98.4% White, 0.2% Asian, and 1.4% from two or more races. Hispanic or Latino of any race were 1.8% of the population.

There were 168 households, of which 37.5% had children under the age of 18 living with them, 53.6% were married couples living together, 11.3% had a female householder with no husband present, 5.4% had a male householder with no wife present, and 29.8% were non-families. 23.2% of all households were made up of individuals, and 7.8% had someone living alone who was 65 years of age or older. The average household size was 2.60 and the average family size was 3.03.

The median age in the city was 36 years. 27.5% of residents were under the age of 18; 7.8% were between the ages of 18 and 24; 27.7% were from 25 to 44; 29.1% were from 45 to 64; and 7.8% were 65 years of age or older. The gender makeup of the city was 51.1% male and 48.9% female.

2000 census
As of the census of 2000, there were 318 people, 117 households, and 89 families living in the city. The racial makeup of the city was 98.74% White, 0.63% Asian, and 0.63% from two or more races. Hispanic or Latino of any race were 1.26% of the population.

There were 117 households, out of which 38.5% had children under the age of 18 living with them, 65.0% were married couples living together, 6.0% had a female householder with no husband present, and 23.9% were non-families. 22.2% of all households were made up of individuals, and 4.3% had someone living alone who was 65 years of age or older. The average household size was 2.72 and the average family size was 3.13.

In the city, the population was spread out, with 28.9% under the age of 18, 6.6% from 18 to 24, 33.0% from 25 to 44, 20.4% from 45 to 64, and 11.0% who were 65 years of age or older. The median age was 35 years. For every 100 females, there were 101.3 males. For every 100 females age 18 and over, there were 98.2 males.

The median income for a household in the city was $42,750, and the median income for a family was $48,125. Males had a median income of $35,375 versus $25,000 for females. The per capita income for the city was $16,947. About 3.9% of families and 4.3% of the population were below the poverty line, including none of those under age 18 and 13.5% of those age 65 or over.

2020 United States Presidential Election 
According to The New York Times' "Extremely Detailed Map of the 2020 Election", most of Randolph voted in favor of Donald Trump over Joe Biden, with margins ranging from +23 percentage points to +40 percentage points in support of Trump.

Infrastructure

Roads
State Highway 56, County Road 88 / 292nd Street East, and County Road 83 are main routes in the community.

Nearby routes include U.S. Highway 52, State Highway 19, County Road 47 / Northfield Boulevard, and County Road 86.

Airport
Stanton Airfield is located five miles south of Randolph but is primarily a general aviation airport.

References

External links
Randolph Schools site

Cities in Dakota County, Minnesota
Cities in Minnesota